Demirci is a town and district of Manisa Province in the Aegean region of Turkey. According to the 2000 census, population of the district is 59,314, of which 21,230 live in the town of Demirci.

History
From 1867 until 1922, Demirci was part of the Aidin Vilayet of the Ottoman Empire.

Economy
Demirci is one of the well known handmade Turkish carpet production centers in Manisa. Demirci carpets have different pattern and styles, such as "Yağcıbedir carpet".

Notes

References

External links
 District governor's official website 
 Road map of Demirci and environs
 Various images of Demirci, Manisa

Populated places in Manisa Province
Districts of Manisa Province